FGP may refer to

 Facility Credit Guarantee Program of the United States Department of Agriculture
 Ferrellgas, an American energy company
 Floral Genome Project
 Flying geese paradigm
 Four Golden Princesses, a Malaysian girl group
 Fundic gland polyposis
 Federal Judicial Police, part of the Belgian Federal Police